Medical narcissism is a term coined by John Banja in his book, Medical Errors and Medical Narcissism.

Banja defines "medical narcissism" as the need of health professionals to preserve their self-esteem leading to the compromise of error disclosure to patients.

In the book he explores the psychological, ethical and legal effects of medical errors and the extent to which a need to constantly assert their competence can cause otherwise capable, and even exceptional, professionals to fall into narcissistic traps.

He claims that:

References

Practice of medicine
Narcissism